Feel So Young is the fifteenth studio album by Australian-American pop singer Helen Reddy, released in 1990 by her own record label, Helen Reddy, Inc.. The album included new recordings of some of her hits ("Ain't No Way to Treat a Lady", "Angie Baby ", "I Am Woman", and "You and Me Against the World") and two songs from her 1983 Imagination album ("Let's Go Up" and "Looks Like Love") as well as four new songs. It has been reissued by many other independent labels under various names and with varying track lists, some of which include some or all of three additional re-recordings of "Delta Dawn", "I Don't Know How to Love Him", and "Leave Me Alone (Ruby Red Dress)".

Background

Since Helen Reddy's acrimonious divorce from American manager Jeffrey Wald in 1983 due to a custody battle with their son, she became her own manager and booking agent by forming her eponymous production company and record label, Helen Reddy Inc., at Santa Monica, California, to exert artistic and legal controls and "own the masters to these songs". The album Feel So Young was conceived as "a record of how they sounded now", in Reddy's words, which contains new recordings of previous hits. The album was recorded at Jackson Browne's Groove Masters Studio, Santa Monica, California in August 1990.

At the time of the initial release, the album was distributed primarily in the United States, Japan and England by Helen Reddy Records, Alfa Records and Pickwick Records, respectively, on CD and cassette tapes. In the United States, the album was released as a mail order in an "environmentally sensitive packaging", as stated in one of her advertisements.

Reissue history

Reception
Critic Al Campbell of Allmusic wrote retrospectively: "While a few of the remakes are adequate, the majority are not in the same league as the originals." He also advises, "Other compilations are available containing the definitive versions of these hits so don't waste your money on this set."

Track listing
 "Feel So Young" (Mack Gordon, Josef Myrow) – 3:03
 "Ain't No Way to Treat a Lady" (Harriet Schock) – 4:01
 "Let's Go Up" (Franne Golde, Peter Ivers) – 4:14
 "Angie Baby" (Alan O'Day) – 4:00
 "Here in My Arms"(Mary Ekler) – 4:42
 "Looks Like Love" (Keith Stegall) – 2:55
 "You and Me Against the World" (Kenny Ascher, Paul Williams) – 3:55 
 "Lost in the Shuffle" (Gary Rue) – 3:11
 "I Am Woman" (Ray Burton, Helen Reddy) – 2:57
 "That's All" (Alan Brandt, Bob Haymes) – 4:27

 Reissue bonus tracks
 "Leave Me Alone (Ruby Red Dress)" (Linda Laurie) – 3:26
 "I Don't Know How to Love Him" (Tim Rice, Andrew Lloyd Webber) – 3:15
 "Delta Dawn" (Larry Collins, Alex Harvey) – 3:08

Personnel

Musicians
Helen Reddy – vocals
Milton Ruth – drums
Wally Minko – piano
Bill Breland – bass; background vocals
Teresa Russell – guitar; background vocals
Doug Norwine – alto and tenor sax
Rick Baptist – flugelhorn and trumpet
Jessica Williams – solo background vocalist

Production
Helen Reddy – executive producer
Milton Ruth – producer
Dan Garcia – producer; recording engineer; mixing engineer
Paul Dieter – assistant engineer

Notes

1990 albums
Helen Reddy albums